A Nigerian Brazilian is a Brazilian person of full, partial, or predominantly Nigerian ancestry, or a Nigerian-born person residing in Brazil. 

The over 90,000 Nigerians living illegally in Brazil without proper documentation before 1 February 2019 are to be benefited from amnesty offers by the Brazilian Government. The Nigerian Ambassador to Brazil, Kayode Garrick, made this known to the News Agency of Nigeria (NAN) in Brasília. Garrick, said that over 2,000 Nigerian potential beneficiaries of the Brazilian amnesty proclamation were among the 5,000 Nigerians currently living in the country. In September 2008, the Nigerian government opened the Casa da Nigéria or "Nigerian Culture House" in the historic Pelourinho neighborhood of Salvador, Bahia, with the support of the governments of Bahia and Brazil.

2011 Polemics on Racist University Professor in the Northeast

A case of xenophobic/racist prejudice of a university professor against a Nigerian student in the Federal University of Maranhão shocked the country in mid-2011. Thousands of students subsequently signed a petition calling for the expelling of the professor.

See also
 Brazil–Nigeria relations

References

Ethnic groups in Brazil
Immi